Noah Landis is an American keyboardist, best known as the keyboard player for American band Neurosis since 1995. Landis's keyboard sound varies between textural and moody overlays, sampled effects/noises and the occasional hook.

Landis also plays in the band Blood and Time, and was the lead singer for the punk rock band Blister, and is a founding member and guitarist of the 80's political punk band Christ on Parade who reunited for tours in both Europe and the United States in the late-2000s. He is a member of the experimental/noise project Tribes of Neurot, Neurosis' alter ego, along with the Scott Kelly's The Road Home.

Landis runs a small recording studio in Oakland and restores a vintage Chevrolet El Camino in his free time. Neurosis' Landis, Dave Edwardson, and Jason Roeder typically avoid interviews.

References

Living people
Year of birth missing (living people)
Neurosis (band) members
21st-century American keyboardists